Sphelodon is a genus of ichneumon wasps in the family Ichneumonidae. There are about nine described species in Sphelodon.

Species
These nine species belong to the genus Sphelodon:
 Sphelodon annulicornis (Morley, 1914) c g
 Sphelodon antioquensis Herrera-Florez, 2017 g
 Sphelodon beameri Dasch, 1988 c g
 Sphelodon concolor Dasch, 1988 c g
 Sphelodon guanacastensis Godoy & Gauld, 2002 c g
 Sphelodon nomene (Davis, 1898) c g
 Sphelodon phoxopteridis (Weed, 1888) c g b
 Sphelodon ugaldei Godoy & Gauld, 2002 c g
 Sphelodon wardae Godoy & Gauld, 2002 c g
Data sources: i = ITIS, c = Catalogue of Life, g = GBIF, b = Bugguide.net

References

Further reading

External links

 

Parasitic wasps